A betting strategy (also known as betting system) is a structured approach to gambling, in the attempt to produce a profit. To be successful, the system must change the house edge into a player advantage — which is impossible for pure games of probability with fixed odds, akin to a perpetual motion machine. Betting systems are often predicated on statistical analysis.

Mathematically, no betting system can alter long-term expected results in a game with random, independent trials, although they can make for higher odds of short-term winning at the cost of increased risk, and are an enjoyable gambling experience for some people. Strategies which take into account the changing odds that exist in some games (e.g. card counting and handicapping), can alter long-term results.

This is formally stated by game theorist Richard Arnold Epstein in The Theory of Gambling and Statistical Logic as:

Examples
Common betting systems include:
 Card games – Card counting
 Roulette – Martingale
 Sports – Handicapping
 Martingale
 Kelly criterion
 Split martingale
 Anti-martingale
 d'Alembert system
 Oscar's grind

Horse racing
Some Horse racing betting systems can be based on pure statistical analysis of the odds, while others also analysis of physical factors (e.g. the horses' form, jockey form and lane draw). Common forms of betting systems for horse racing are:
 hedging- betting on multiple outcomes in a race
 arbitrage- lay the horse a low price and back it at a high price

See also
Gambler's fallacy
House edge
Mathematics of bookmaking
Parimutuel betting

References

 
Strategy